Major General Francis Arthur Sutton M.C. (born England 14 February 1884, died Hong Kong 22 October 1944) was an English adventurer known as "One Arm Sutton" after losing part of an arm by a hand grenade at the Battle of Gallipoli where he was awarded the Military Cross.

A product of Eton College, Sutton studied two years of engineering at University of London before working in civil engineering in Argentina, Mexico, and the US after 1906.

Sutton held a commission in the Royal Engineers during World War I. Following the war he built railways in Mexico and Argentina and also mined for gold in Siberia and Korea.

Sutton travelled to China where he had purchased manufacturing rights for the Stokes Mortar that he provided to various warlords. He became a major general for the Chinese warlord Zhang Zuolin.  In Mukden, Sutton provided hospitality to Aloha Baker on her round-the-world drive as her party passed through a war zone.

During World War II he was interned in Hong Kong  where he died of dysentery.

Notes

References
 Sutton, F. A. One Arm Sutton 1933 Macmillan
 Drage, Charles General of Fortune: The Story of One Arm Sutton 1973 White Lion Publishers

1884 births
1944 deaths
Royal Engineers officers

National Revolutionary Army generals
Recipients of the Military Cross
English mercenaries
Deaths from dysentery
British Army personnel of World War I
Canadian amputees
English amputees
British people who died in Japanese internment camps
English expatriates in Mexico
English expatriates in the United States
English expatriates in Argentina
English expatriates in China
Alumni of the University of London